America's Funnyman is a 1996 album by alternative comedian Neil Hamburger. It was released by Drag City on September 2, 1996.

Track listing
All tracks written by Neil Hamburger

"America's Funnyman" – 0:54
"The Diagnosis" – 0:48
"A Moment of Silence" – 0:23
"Factory Outlet Malls" – 0:12
"Menswear" – 0:04
"Gourmet Chocolate" – 0:01
"Women's Lingerie" – 0:30
"Doctors" – 0:25
"The Army Reserve" – 0:58
"Divorce" – 0:45
"Anniversarys" – 0:24
"Warehouse Shopping" – 0:39
"Lawsuit Crazy" – 0:28
"Single Life" – 0:04
"Condoms" – 2:06
"Smoking" – 0:15
"Gusty Winds" – 0:24
"The Audience" – 0:26
"Bigotry" – 0:48
"AandR People" – 0:21
"The Ex-Wife" – 0:27
"Talk Show Hosts" – 0:25
"Motels" – 0:25
"The Zipper Shtick" – 0:39
"The Top Ten - Censored!" – 1:00
"O.J." – 2:03
"Bill and Hillary" – 0:22
"Newt Gingrich" – 0:04
"Celebrity Liver Transplants" – 0:06
"Flashers" – 0:40
"Cop Shows" – 0:57
"Lawyers" – 0:50
"The Most Annoying Thing" – 1:17
"The Speed Limit" – 0:12
"G-Strings" – 0:20
"Divorce" – 0:17
"Rich Little Tribute" – 1:01
"The Battle Between the Sexes" – 2:13
"The X-Rated Hot Dog Vendor" – 4:57
"Gambling" – 1:43
"Dating" – 0:31
"Suicide" – 1:08
"Restaurants" – 0:47
"Motels" – 1:01

References

Gregg Turkington albums
Drag City (record label) albums
1996 albums